Juruena National Park, declared in 2006, is the third largest national park of Brazil. It is located along the Juruena River, in the north of Mato Grosso state and the south of Amazonas state. It forms part of a corridor of protected areas that is meant to contain agricultural expansion into the Amazon rainforest.

Location

It is the third largest in Brazil.
It contains parts of the municipalities of Apuí and Maués in Amazonas,  and Cotriguaçu, Nova Bandeirantes and Apiacás in Mato Grosso.
It adjoins the  Sucunduri State Park in the municipality of Apuí.
The Igarapés do Juruena State Park to the west overlaps by almost 53% with the Juruena National Park.

About 49% of the park is flat plains, 18% gently undulating, 21% undulating, and 10% strongly undulating. 1% is mountainous.
The park holds 39 river sub-basins.
The largest is that of the São Tomé River, which occupies 23% of the area and has all its sources in the park.
The Sucunduri River basin in the north of the park covers 10% of the total area.
The rivers are classed as clear water. They are green or olive-green in the dry seasons, muddy in the rainy season.
Navigability is poor for vessels of any size due to rocky outcrops, small or large rapids and waterfalls.

History

Juruena National Park was created by decree on 5 June 2006 and is administered by the federal Chico Mendes Institute for Biodiversity Conservation.
It is one of the parks created under the Amazon Region Protected Areas Programme (ARPA) launched in 2002.

In 2014 the federal government was considering a proposal to declare the Juruena National Park an area of public utility in preparation for constructing two hydroelectric dams in the site, the São Simão Alto and Salto Augusto Baixo.
The planned dams had a forecast capacity of 4,940 MW.
The National Council for Energy Policy (CNPE) had two seats for civil society members, but these had not been filled.
In September 2014 the federal government withdrew its proposal.
The dams would have flooded parts of the Juruena National Park, Igarapés do Juruena State Park and the Escondido and Apiaká do Pontal indigenous territories in Mato Grosso, and would have affected part of the Sucunduri State Park in Amazonas and other indigenous territories.

Conservation

The park is classed as IUCN protected area category II (national park).
The basic objective is to preserve natural ecosystems of great ecological relevance and scenic beauty such as the waterfalls of the Juruena River at Salto Augusto and San Simon, and to support scientific research, environmental education and interpretation, recreation in contact with nature and ecological tourism.
The park aims to protect the  biological diversity and natural landscapes of the lower Juruena - Teles Pires and upper Tapajós region.
It ensures a healthy ecosystem in the crucial Southern Amazon region between the Tapajós and Madeira rivers.
The park protects many endangered species including the jaguar, giant otter and harpy eagle.

The park forms part of an ecological corridor, that includes Xingu Indigenous Park in Mato Grosso and Pará, the Terra do Meio Mosaic in Pará, the Juruena National Park in Amazonas and  Mato Grosso, the Apuí Mosaic in Amazonas and then the Campos Amazônicos National Park in Amazonas and Roraima.
The corridor is intended to contain agricultural expansion into the central Amazon region and deforestation.
The conservation unit is supported by the Amazon Region Protected Areas Program.

Environment 

The region is a transition zone between the Amazon biome and the xeromorphic formations of the Cerrado biome. The remaining land holds semi-deciduous forest or disturbed vegetation. Although there is controversy over the classification, the non-forest areas resemble Campinarana formations.

412 bird species have been identified, of which 40 are endemic to the southern Amazon and at least 26 are restricted to the Madeira - Tapajós.
Endemic species include bald parrot (Pyrilia aurantiocephala), bare-eyed antbird (Rhegmatorhina gymnops), tooth-billed wren (Odontorchilus cinereus), snow-capped manakin (Lepidothrix nattereri), Gould's toucanet (Selenidera gouldii), dark-winged trumpeter (Psophia viridis) and crimson-bellied parakeet (Pyrrhura perlata). Migratory birds include purple martin (Progne subis), barn swallow (Hirundo rustica), white-throated kingbird (Tyrannus albogularis), fork-tailed flycatcher (Tyrannus savana), and tropical kingbird (Tyrannus melancholicus).

The ashy black titi (Callicebus cinerascens) is endemic. Migratory fish include Boulengerella ocellata, Brachyplatystoma filamentosum, Hydrolycus armatus, Leiarius marmoratus, Pseudoplatystoma species, Prochilodus nigricans, Pseudoplatystoma fasciatum and Tympanopleura atronasus.

Notes

Sources

National parks of Brazil
Protected areas of Mato Grosso
Protected areas of Amazonas (Brazilian state)
Protected areas established in 2006